Terthreutis bulligera is a species of moth of the  family Tortricidae. It is found in India (Bengal, Sikkim), Nepal, Taiwan and Vietnam.

The wingspan is about 20 mm. The ground colour of the forewings is whitish cream suffused with brownish, sparsely strigulated with brown. The terminal area is darker and more brown or ochreous brownish. The markings are yellowish brown with chestnut shades. The hindwings are whitish with a brownish admixture.

References

Archipini
Moths of Asia
Moths of Taiwan
Moths described in 1928